The 4.2 cm Pak 41 (Panzerabwehrkanone —"anti-tank gun") was a light anti-tank gun issued to German airborne units in World War II. This gun was externally similar to the 3.7 cm Pak 36, using a modified version of the latter's carriage, but used the squeeze bore principle (in German called Gerlich after Hermann Gerlich, who developed the principle in the 1920s, reportedly for a hunting rifle) to boost its velocity, and hence armour-piercing ability. Production was terminated in June 1942, after the delivery of 313 guns. By November 1943, 47 remained in service.

Specifications 
Projectile weight: AP

See also
 2.8 cm sPzB 41
 7.5 cm Pak 41
 Littlejohn adaptor

References 
 Gander, Terry and Chamberlain, Peter. Weapons of the Third Reich: An Encyclopedic Survey of All Small Arms, Artillery and Special Weapons of the German Land Forces 1939-1945. New York: Doubleday, 1979 
 Hogg, Ian V. German Artillery of World War Two. 2nd corrected edition. Mechanicsville, PA: Stackpole Books, 1997 

World War II anti-tank guns of Germany
40 mm artillery
Weapons and ammunition introduced in 1941